Emma Martina Luigia Morano  (29 November 1899 – 15 April 2017) was an Italian supercentenarian. She was the world's oldest living person from 13 May 2016 until her death on 15 April 2017, aged 117 years and 137 days. At the time of her death, she was also the last living person verified to have been born in the 1800s. She is the oldest Italian person ever and the third-oldest European person ever behind Jeanne Calment (1875–1997) and Lucile Randon (1904–2023).

Early life 

Emma Martina Luigia Morano was born on 29 November 1899 in Civiasco, Vercelli, Piedmont, to Giovanni Morano and Matilde Bresciani, the eldest of eight children (five daughters and three sons). She had a long-lived family: her mother, an aunt and some of her siblings turned 90, and one of her sisters, Angela Morano (1908–2011), died at age 102.

When she was a child she moved from the Sesia Valley to Ossola for her father's job, but the climate was so unhealthy there that a physician advised her family to live somewhere with more moderate weather, so she moved to Verbania, on Lake Maggiore, where she lived the rest of her life. In October 1926, she married Giovanni Martinuzzi (1901–1978), and her only child was born in 1937 but died when he was only six months old. The marriage was not a happy one, so in 1938, Morano separated from her husband, driving him out of the house.

Later life 

Until 1954 Morano worked at Maioni Industry, a jute factory in her town. She subsequently worked in the kitchen of Collegio Santa Maria, a Marianist boarding school in Verbania, until her retirement at the age of 75.

In December 2011 she was awarded the honour of Knight of the Order of Merit of the Italian Republic by President Giorgio Napolitano.

In 2013, when asked about the secret of her longevity, she said that she ate three eggs a day, occasionally drank a glass of homemade grappa, and enjoyed a chocolate sometimes, but, above all, she thought positively about the future. She was still living alone in her home on her 115th birthday. In 2016 she credited her long life to her diet of raw eggs and cookies, and to staying single.

Morano became the oldest living person in Italy and Europe after the death of Maria Redaelli on 2 April 2013. On her 114th birthday, she gave a short live TV interview to a RAI show. On her 116th birthday, Morano received congratulations from Pope Francis.

She surpassed the age of Venere Pizzinato in August 2014 and Dina Manfredini (who died in the United States) in August 2015, to become the oldest Italian person ever. On 13 May 2016, upon the death of American woman Susannah Mushatt Jones, Morano became the world's oldest living person and also the last living person verified to have been born before 1900.  On 29 July 2016, she was presented with a certificate from Guinness World Records recognizing her as the oldest person alive.  Festivities celebrating her 117th birthday on 29 November 2016 were broadcast live in Italy.

Death 
Morano died at her home in Verbania, Italy, on 15 April 2017 at the age of 117.  At the time of her death, she was the fourth-oldest person in recorded history. Upon Morano's death, Violet Brown became the world's oldest living person.

See also 
List of Italian supercentenarians
List of European supercentenarians
List of the verified oldest people
List of the oldest people by country
Longevity
Oldest people

Notes

References

External links

1899 births
2017 deaths
Women supercentenarians
Italian supercentenarians
Knights Grand Cross of the Order of Merit of the Italian Republic
People from Civiasco
People from Verbania